MPowerFM is a commercial radio station serving Mpumalanga. Broadcasting from studios in Emalahleni and Nelspruit, MPowerFM went on air in December 2007.

History

MPowerFM was a dream that became a reality in the early part of 2006. With African Media Entertainment (AME) and Direng, shareholders and owners of various radio stations in South Africa, approaching the Lowveld Chamber of Business and Commerce to enter into a bid for the tender of the only commercial radio licence to be issued by ICASA in Mpumalanga. After a lengthy process of acquiring potential local investors, as well as investors from up country, a successful bid was presented to ICASA and won. This resulted in the birth of MPowerFM - the first and only commercial radio station in Mpumalanga.

State of the art equipment was installed into their studios, which broadcast across the province on the 7 frequencies made available to them by Sentec.

Over the past few years some changes have occurred, with challenges that are faced by many startup companies. From opening the Witbank (Emalahleni) Studio at the Ridge to moving their main studio's to the Grove Shopping Centre in the Riverside Precinct in Nelspruit. Things have progressed and MPowerFM is fast becoming the heart of Mpumalanga. With great emphasis being placed on supporting charities and communities with specific needs, the radio station continues to strive and meet the expectations of the community at large.

Take over

Mpowerfm was bought out by Times Media Group in December 2013. The radio station now goes by the name RISEfm (www.risefm.co.za)

Coverage Areas & Frequencies
Broadcasting from eMalahleni (Witbank) to all of Mpumalanga

Current Presenters
•Shaun Lukhele
•Portia Adams
•Tony Murrell
•Dave Walters
•Sasha
•Sam Jagger
•Celani Dubai
•Desire Malunga

Broadcast Languages
English

Broadcast Time
24/7

Target Audience
LSM Groups 7 – 10
Adults

Programme Format
80% Music
20% Talk

Listenership Figures

References

External links 
MPowerFM Website
SAARF Website
Sentech Website

Radio stations in South Africa
Mass media in Mpumalanga